Slavica Ecclestone ( Radić; born 2 June 1958) is a Croatian former model and the ex-wife of former Formula 1 CEO Bernie Ecclestone.

Early life 
Ecclestone was born in Rijeka, where her Serb parents—Jovan "Jovo" Radić and Ljubica Malić from Maglajani and Riječani, respectively, both villages within the Laktaši municipality, PR Bosnia and Herzegovina—had settled shortly before her birth in search of expanded job opportunities. The family soon moved back to northern Bosnia to her father's village, meaning Slavica would spend the majority of her childhood in Maglajani. After her parents divorced when she was seven years old, being raised by her mother Ljubica, Slavica was taught to "not do to someone else what you wouldn't want to be done to yourself."

Career 
In her early career, Slavica worked as a fashion model, modelling for a number of clients, including the designer Armani. While working on a Formula One promotional event for Armani at the 1982 Italian Grand Prix in Monza, the twenty-four-year-old model met fifty-two-year-old Formula One chief Bernie Ecclestone.

Bernie pursued Slavica despite the 28-year age difference, the language barrier (she spoke Serbo-Croatian and Italian, he spoke only English), and their difference in height.

Personal life 

From her marriage, Slavica has two daughters, Tamara (1984) and Petra (1988).

In November 2008, Slavica filed for divorce after 23 years of marriage. The divorce was granted on 11 March 2009. She ranked 194 in The Sunday Times' Rich List after she was awarded an estimated £740 million from her divorce.

In December 2019, she put her Chelsea mansion up for sale for more than £100m after daughter Tamara's home in Kensington Palace Gardens was raided and jewels worth £50m were stolen.

References 

1958 births
Living people
Slavica
Formula One people
People from Rijeka
Serbs of Croatia
Yugoslav emigrants to the United Kingdom
Racing drivers' wives and girlfriends
Croatian female models